Delber Medina Rodríguez (born 12 February 1960) is a Mexican politician from the National Action Party. From 2006 to 2009 he served as Deputy of the LX Legislature of the Mexican Congress representing Nayarit.

References

1960 births
Living people
Politicians from Nayarit
National Action Party (Mexico) politicians
21st-century Mexican politicians
Deputies of the LX Legislature of Mexico
Members of the Chamber of Deputies (Mexico) for Nayarit
People from Tecuala